Wicked Stepmother is a 1989 American black comedy film written, produced, and directed by Larry Cohen and starring Bette Davis and Barbara Carrera.

Wicked Stepmother is best known for being the last film of Bette Davis, who withdrew from the project after filming began, citing major problems with the script, Cohen's direction, and the way she was being photographed. Cohen later claimed she really dropped out due to ill health but avoided publicizing the truth for fear it would affect potential future employment. Davis disputed this claim.

Synopsis
The original plot cast Davis as the title character, a chain-smoking witch named Miranda, who has married Sam while his vegetarian daughter Jenny and son-in-law Steve are on vacation. They return to find their new stepmother has filled their refrigerator with meat and played havoc with their collection of herbs. To explain Davis' absence, the script was rewritten to introduce Miranda's daughter Priscilla, a witch who inhabited Miranda's cat. They both share one existence in human form and while one is human the other must live in the form of a cat the rest of the time.  Priscilla takes on a human form while Miranda's spirit inhabits the body of the cat. Priscilla then sets out to defeat Jenny who has figured out that there is something going on. Priscilla uses witchcraft and deception to convince everyone Jenny is wrong. The entire time she refuses to switch bodies with Miranda. Jenny then figures out that they're witches and tries to stop them from ruining her family.

Principal cast
Bette Davis as Miranda Pierpoint
Barbara Carrera as Priscilla Pierpoint
Lionel Stander as Sam
Colleen Camp as Jenny Fisher
David Rasche as Steve Fisher
Shawn Donahue as Mike Fisher
Tom Bosley as Lt. MacIntosh
Richard Moll as Nathan Pringle
Evelyn Keyes as Witch Instructor
James Dixon as Detective Flynn
Seymour Cassel as Feldshine

Joan Crawford appears in a photo as the deceased wife of Sam and mother of Jenny. The estranged relationship between Jenny and her late mother is a reference to the exposé memoir Mommie Dearest, written by Crawford's adopted daughter,  Christina Crawford. Crawford was also known for her feud with Davis during the filming of What Ever Happened to Baby Jane?.

Critical reception
TV Guide calls the film "a good-natured, occasionally hilarious spookshow, graced with a few ingenious special effects and sassily acted - with Davis giving a gleefully nasty, if abbreviated, last film performance.

See also
 List of American films of 1989

References

External links

I Killed Bette Davis

1989 films
1989 comedy films
Films about witchcraft
1980s English-language films
Metro-Goldwyn-Mayer films
Films directed by Larry Cohen
Films scored by Robert Folk
Films with screenplays by Larry Cohen
American comedy films
1980s American films